The 1991 West Coast Conference men's basketball tournament was the fifth edition of the tournament, held March 2–4 at the Toso Pavilion at Santa Clara University in Santa Clara, California. 

Top seed Pepperdine entered the tournament on a thirteen-game winning streak and defeated #4 seed  in the championship game,  in overtime, to win the Waves' first WCC tournament title.

Pepperdine's Doug Christie, the WCC player of the year, sprained his right knee in the quarterfinal opener against Portland, which ended his season.

The Waves received the conference's automatic bid to the 64-team NCAA tournament as the fourteenth seed in the West regional.

Bracket

References

West Coast Conference men's basketball tournament
Tournament
West Coast Athletic Conference men's basketball tournament
West Coast Athletic Conference men's basketball tournament